Middlebury Academy is a historic school in Wyoming, Wyoming County, New York.  The Greek Revival style structure was erected by the citizens of Wyoming in 1817.  Originally sponsored by the local Baptist church, the academy became a Wyoming County Union Free School in 1880 and operated as a school until 1912.  It is now home to the Middlebury Historical Society.  It is located within the boundaries of the Wyoming Village Historic District.

It was listed on the National Register of Historic Places in 1973.

References

External links
Middlebury Historical Society (Middlebury Academy) - Wyoming, New York - History Museums on Waymarking.com
Wyoming County, NY Tourism - includes museum information

Museums in Wyoming County, New York
School buildings on the National Register of Historic Places in New York (state)
History museums in New York (state)
Greek Revival architecture in New York (state)
Education museums in the United States
Historical society museums in New York (state)
National Register of Historic Places in Wyoming County, New York